Cyprus-Czech relations are foreign relations between Cyprus and the Czech Republic. Cyprus has an embassy in Prague. The Czech Republic has an embassy in Nicosia and two honorary consulates in Limassol and Nicosia. Both countries are full members of the European Union and the Council of Europe.
The two countries joined the European Union in 2004.

History 
President of the House of Representatives of Cyprus Demetris Christofias made an official visit to Czech Republic in 2007.

Diplomacy

Republic of Cyprus
Prague (Embassy)

Republic of the Czech Republic
Nicosia (Embassy)

See also 
 Foreign relations of Cyprus
 Foreign relations of the Czech Republic
 2004 enlargement of the European Union

References

External links 
 Czech embassy in Nicosia

 
Czech Republic
Cyprus